Ebon Atoll (Marshallese:) is a coral atoll of 22 islands in the Pacific Ocean, forming a legislative district of the Ralik Chain of the Marshall Islands. A winding passage, the Ebon Channel, leads to the lagoon from the southwest edge of the atoll. In documents and accounts from the 1800s, it was also known as Boston, Covell's Group, Fourteen Islands, and Linnez.

History
Ebon Atoll was visited by commercial whaling vessels in the 19th century. The first such vessel on record was the Newark in 1837. The last whaler known to have visited was the Andrew Hicks in 1905.

The schooner Glencoe was taken and its crew massacred by Marshallese at Ebon in 1851 – one of three vessels attacked in the Marshall Islands in 1851 and 1852. There were several motives, and by some accounts the ship's crew had been abducting island women for sale to plantation owners (slavery) at other destinations.

Missionaries sent by the American Board of Commissioners for Foreign Missions in Boston began missionary activities in the Marshall Islands in 1857, establishing a mission at Ebon.

Ebon was claimed by the Empire of Germany along with the rest of the Marshall Islands in 1884, and the Germans established a trading outpost. After World War I, the island came under the South Seas Mandate of the Empire of Japan, which had a garrison there late in World War II. The base became part of the vast US Naval Base Marshall Islands. At the end of WW II, Ebon Atoll became a part of the Trust Territory of the Pacific Islands under the control of the United States, until the independence of the Marshall Islands in 1986.

On January 30, 2014, castaway José Salvador Alvarenga, a Salvadorian national who had been working in Mexico as a fisherman, was found by locals from Ebon after he had pulled his boat ashore on Enienaitok Islet at the conclusion of a 14-month drifting voyage of 10,800 kilometers (6,700 miles) across the Pacific.

Demography
In the period between 1920 and 1999, different governmental officials have conducted eleven census reports from Ebon, with an average total population of 735 people. The lowest count was under the Japanese colonial power in 1925, with 552 people, and the highest in 1999 – 20 years after independence – with 902 people. The most recent official census, conducted in 2011, has the total population at 706 people. The same report also notes that Ebon is among the atolls and islands of the Marshalls with a positive net migration rate – even though the population has gone down with 196 people since the 1999 census. It is also curious to note that various German sources claim a significantly higher population – ranging from 1,000 to 2,000 people – in a 46-year period, 1860–1906. Moreover, in an unpublished interview series with Leonard Mason in 1949–1950, Dwight Heine (an Ebon local) tells of a legendary typhoon that swept Ebon sometime in the 1850s, the aftermath of which left the atoll population decimated. Before the typhoon hit, Heine says, the Ebon population numbered several thousand.

Today, people permanently inhabit four of the islets on the atoll. The main island, Ebon [Epoon], houses a medical facility and the council house, and has the largest population. Tōkā has fewer residents but is more densely populated than Ebon. The other two are Enekoion [Āne-ko-ion] and Enilok [Āni-look]. Of the four, Āni-look is the only one without an elementary school, so children usually move to family members on Tōkā during school years. Many people have land rights on other islets and live there sporadically to work with copra production. The islets with the largest production rate are Āne-armej, Kumkumļap, and Enienaitok [Āni-eņ-aetok].

Education
Marshall Islands Public School System operates public schools:
 Ebon Elementary School
 Enekoion Elementary School
 Toka Elementary School

Students are zoned to Jaluit High School in Jaluit Atoll.

Transportation
Ebon Airport serves the atoll by air, with smaller ships sometimes visiting too.

Footnotes

References

 
 
 
 

Atolls of the Marshall Islands
Ralik Chain
Municipalities of the Marshall Islands